Solieria vacua is a European species of fly in the family Tachinidae.

References 

Tachininae
Diptera of Europe
Insects described in 1861
Taxa named by Camillo Rondani